The 1935–36 season was Stoke City's 36th season in the Football League and the 22nd in the First Division.

In June 1935 long-serving defender Bob McGrory replaced Tom Mather as first-team manager and in his first season in charge Stoke went on to record their finest season up to this point finishing in 4th position in the First Division. They were never out of the top four for the last three months of the season and whilst they never really threatened runaway leaders Sunderland, Stoke were considered to be one of the best teams in the country. The 1935–36 season finish of 4th is only matched by the performance by the Stoke team of the 1946–47 season.

Season review

League
After last season Stoke went on a tour of Denmark winning all three matches against local opposition. On their return to England in June 1935, Bob McGrory replaced Tom Mather as manager. Mather had been at the helm for over eleven years and did well in taking Stoke from Third Division football to the First. It also spelt the end of McGrory's playing career in which he made 510 appearances for the club, a total not to be surpassed for 24 years.

The first signing McGrory made was that of Huddersfield Town goalkeeper Norman Wilkinson he would prove to be a sound addition. Despite this McGrory gave the squad a vote of confidence and indeed few clubs in the country showed little alteration to their squads than Stoke City. Whilst it was 'as you were' on the playing side, Stoke appointed a host of new backroom staff and Arthur Turner was made club captain. The supporters were disappointed that despite there being money available no new players arrived and their concerns were increased when the reserves beat the first team in a public friendly match.

The supporters need not have worried as McGrory's first season turned out to be one of the finest in the club's history as they achieved fourth place in the First Division. They were never out of the top four for the last three months of the season and were generally accepted as one of the countries most impressive sides. With more players being promoted from the youth ranks Stoke looked set for a bright future.

FA Cup
Stoke required replays to beat lower league Millwall and Manchester United but Barnsley knocked Stoke out 2–1 in the fifth round.

Final league table

Results
Stoke's score comes first

Legend

Football League First Division

FA Cup

Squad statistics

References

Stoke City F.C. seasons
Stoke